Donald Wolcott (April 13, 1990) is a jazz musician from Rockville, Maryland.

Biography 

Donald Wolcott began training as a pianist at age five. He initially studied classical piano, but became more interested in jazz by the time he reached middle school. In high school, he was the pianist for the jazz ensemble, a position he held until graduation. He formed the rock band "Three Easy Payments," and performed with them over the next four years, singing lead vocals, playing bass and keyboards, and writing songs. In addition, he served as the producer and manager for the group. He is also self-taught in bass, guitar, and drums.

In 2005, Wolcott received acclaim from the University of the Arts in Philadelphia as a top soloist in their annual jazz festival. In 2006, he was accepted as a bassist into the Montgomery County Honors Jazz Ensemble. In 2007, he earned an honorable mention for jazz performance in the National Distinguished Scholar Competition, and in 2008, he received the "Maestro Award" at the Washington D.C. Heritage Music Festival.

Wolcott graduated from Rockville High School in Maryland in 2008. He accepted a scholarship to Towson University, where he majored in Jazz/Commercial Performance. He now works professionally as a pianist in the Baltimore/Washington D.C. area and teaches music at Saint James Academy in Monkton, MD.

The Diamond Star Project 

The Diamond Star Project is a collaboration between the rock band Point Valid and American mezzo-soprano and science fiction author Catherine Asaro. It resulted in Point Valid's second CD, Diamond Star (Starflight Music, April 2009), which is a soundtrack for Asaro's novel Diamond Star (Baen Books, May 2009).

Donald Wolcott joined the Diamond Star Project in 2009, after the members of Point Valid dispersed to pursue their education. He arranged and consolidated the songs from the CD so they could be performed by a duo ensemble in concert, with Wolcott on keyboard and Asaro as the vocalist. Wolcott toured until 2011 with Asaro, where she performed as the Guest of Honor at science fiction conventions, including venues in the United States, at the Danish National Science Fiction Convention and at the New Zealand National Science Fiction Convention
 In 2011, Greg Adams replaced Wolcott as the pianist and band leader for the Diamond Star project.

References

External links 
 Donald Wolcott's Home Page
 Starflight Music on MySpace – includes a list of upcoming shows
 Starflight Music web site

American jazz musicians
American rock musicians
American jazz composers
American male jazz composers
Living people
American male pianists
21st-century American pianists
21st-century American male musicians
Year of birth missing (living people)